Shivaganga Falls is a water fall and a tourist destination located at a distance of  from Sirsi in Karnataka state of India.

Shivaganga Falls 
Shivaganga falls is surrounded by a thick forest of Western Ghats, it was created by a small river Shalmali also known as Bedti river near Sirsi city in Karnataka.

References

Waterfalls of Karnataka
Tourist attractions in Uttara Kannada district
Geography of Uttara Kannada district